Antti Meriläinen (7 October 1887 - 5 March 1942) was a Finnish farmer and politician, born in Sotkamo. He was a member of the Parliament of Finland from 1919 to 1922 and from 1930 to 1939, representing the Social Democratic Party of Finland (SDP).

References

1887 births
1942 deaths
People from Sotkamo
People from Oulu Province (Grand Duchy of Finland)
Social Democratic Party of Finland politicians
Members of the Parliament of Finland (1919–22)
Members of the Parliament of Finland (1930–33)
Members of the Parliament of Finland (1933–36)
Members of the Parliament of Finland (1936–39)